Raklitsa Island is the rocky island in Boisguehenneuc Bay lying 650 m off the northwest coast of Liège Island in the Palmer Archipelago, Antarctica.  The island is 350 m long in east-west direction and 120 m wide.

The island is named after the settlement of Raklitsa in Southeastern Bulgaria.

Location

British mapping in 1978.

Maps
 British Antarctic Territory.  Scale 1:200000 topographic map.  DOS 610 Series, Sheet W 63 60.  Directorate of Overseas Surveys, UK, 1978.
 Antarctic Digital Database (ADD). Scale 1:250000 topographic map of Antarctica. Scientific Committee on Antarctic Research (SCAR). Since 1993, regularly upgraded and updated.

References
 Bulgarian Antarctic Gazetteer. Antarctic Place-names Commission. (details in Bulgarian, basic data in English)
 Raklitsa Island. SCAR Composite Antarctic Gazetteer.

External links
 Raklitsa Island. Copernix satellite image

Islands of the Palmer Archipelago
Bulgaria and the Antarctic